The 2016 Ukrainian Cup Final was a football match that was played on 21 May 2016 in Lviv. For the first time the cup final was held in Lviv. The match was the 25th Ukrainian Cup Final and was contested by Zorya Luhansk and Shakhtar Donetsk.

Road to Lviv 

All fourteen Ukrainian Premier League clubs do not have to go through qualification to get into the competition (Ukrainian Cup), so Zorya and Shakhtar both qualified for the competition automatically.

Previous encounters 

This was not only the first Ukrainian Cup Final between the two teams, but also the first time they meet in this competition. Previously Zorya and Shakhtar met in the Soviet Cup in total of six game (the record was two wins for Zorya and four wins for Shakhtar with Zorya scoring six goals and Shakhtar scoring seven).

It was first Cup Final appearance for Zorya, while their opponents Shakhtar had appeared in 15 Cup Finals winning nine.

Match

Details

See also
 2015–16 Ukrainian Premier League

References

Cup Final
Ukrainian Cup finals
Ukrainian Cup Final 2016
Ukrainian Cup Final 2016
Sport in Lviv
May 2016 sports events in Ukraine